David Douglas Cumming (1900 – after 1922) was a Scottish professional footballer who played as a winger.

References

1900 births
Footballers from Glasgow
Scottish footballers
Association football wingers
Dundee F.C. players
Grimsby Town F.C. players
English Football League players
Year of death missing